Thomas Daniel (16 September 17626 April 1854) was a slave owner and sugar merchant in Bristol who was known as the "King of Bristol" and later in life "Father of Bristol" because of his omnipotence in corporate affairs for over 50 years.  

Across the Americas he owned plantations worked by enslaved Africans and people of African descent. He was a partner in Bristol businesses and owned ships linked directly to the slave economy.

The extent of his family's company Thomas Daniel & Sons in Bristol and Thomas Daniel & Co. in London (founded by his father Thomas Daniel Senior)   slave ownership was such that when slavery was abolished in 1834 the British Government awarded them one of the largest compensation awards in the UK for the ownership of 4,967 enslaved people.

For decades he was a key member of organisations in Bristol such as the Society of Merchant Venturers and the West India Association which lobbied against the abolition of slavery.

He was a leading Tory in Bristol and a member of the Council continuously for more than 56 years. 

Despite his influence on Bristol when alive, very few people today have heard of Daniel because, unlike other slave owners connected to the City such as Edward Colston, Daniel was not a philanthropist. Although he was worth the equivalent of £26.2m when he died – his fortune made from enslaved labour – he did not give a penny to the City where he had lived for 90 years.

Early life
Daniel was born in Barbados on 16 September 1762, the son of slave owner Thomas Daniel (1730–1802) and his wife Eleanor Neil (1737–1774). He was the fourth generation of the Daniel family to be born on the island since his great-grandfather had emigrated there from England in the mid-17th century. His siblings were Eleanor (b. 1761), Anne (b. 1763) and John (b. 1765).

In 1764 Thomas Daniel Snr. returned to England, and settled in Bristol where he established a substantial business as a sugar merchant importing slave-produced sugar whilst still owning Blowers Plantation and slaves in Barbados. Thomas Daniel Snr.'s memorial in Bristol Cathedral refers to him as a "respectable merchant in this city" which as contemporary authors on slavery assert gives no indication of the source of his wealth – enslaved labour.

In 1789 Daniel married Susanna Cave (1767–1846), the daughter of banker John Cave and Susanna Cox. Daniel's sister Anne married Susanna Cave's brother, Stephen. He had six daughters and one son: Maria Anne, Frances, Susanna, Lucy, Eleanor, Emily and Thomas.

Politics
From 1785 until 1835 Daniel served on the Bristol Common Council. He was an Alderman from 1798 until 1835, a Councillor from 1835 until 1841, Sheriff of Bristol in 1786/7, and Mayor in 1797/8. Throughout the 18th century the Whig party predominated in Bristol's Council, but from 1812 Daniel and his fellow Tories gained control until the Municipal Reform Act in 1835, with Daniel having a significant influence during that period. He and his fellow Tories transformed the corporation into a largely Anglican body, and used their influence to raise election funds to support their preferred Tory MP candidates.

At the age of 72, on 1 January 1836, Daniel was again elected as Mayor, but he refused to serve, and the same year he surrendered his leadership of the Tories which he had dominated for decades.

Daniel was one of the earliest members of the West India Association formed in 1782. It was Bristol merchants' main body for dealing with the Government, and lobbying against the abolition of the slave trade. Joining when he was 20, he remained a member for life, holding the offices of Treasurer, Secretary and Chairman.

Daniel was also a member of the Society of Merchant Venturers (acting as both Warden and Master between 1789 and 1805). This was the period when the Society worked to safeguard the interests of planters and all those involved in the Transatlantic Slave Trade. On 15 April 1789 Daniel was one of 21 West India merchants and planters at the first anti-abolitionist meeting convened by the Society of Merchant Venturers.

Business interests
Daniel traded as a sugar merchant from his town residence 20 Berkeley Square, Bristol as Thomas Daniel & Sons, the firm he inherited from his father, importing slave-produced sugar from the Americas. He traded with his brother John Daniel (1768–1853) as Thomas Daniel & Co. in London at 4 Mincing Lane. Thomas Daniel & Sons were the fifth largest importer of slave-produced sugar into Bristol over the 70 year period 1735 to 1800, importing 20,993 hogsheads of sugar between 1785 and 1800.

Between 1786 and 1831 Daniel was the owner or part owner of more than 25 ships mainly sailing back and forwards between Bristol and the Americas with goods connected to the slave economy transporting goods needed on the plantations on the outward journey and slave-produced sugar on the inward journey. At least 1 of his ships had been in the service of the East India Company, but under his ownership sailed back and forwards to the West Indies. Two of his ships (Britannia and Deane) were privateers during the American Revolutionary War. He was also a partner in firms such as Daniel, Harford & Co. importing goods from Newfoundland and northern Europe to Bristol and exporting to the West Indies. 

There is no evidence that he was involved in buying or transporting people in Africa to sell as slaves in the Americas. 

Daniel provided mortgages for plantation owners. Between 1823 and 1843 he and his brother headed the list of British merchants who were the major creditors for estates that passed through the chancery courts in Barbados. During that time they extended £62,694 in credit (the total amount of mortgages extended during this period in Barbados was valued at £256,981).

Daniel was a partner in the bank Ames, Cave and Co.; he had shares in the Bristol Dock Company, and the Bristol Copper Company; he was a partner in the White Rock Company (copper) and the iron merchants Daniel, Harford, Weare and Payne. All of these companies had direct links to the slave economy. See table for details of these and others.

He owned large pockets of land across Bristol. See table below for details.

When the British Government passed the Slavery Abolition Act 1833 they awarded £20 million to slave owners for the loss of their property enslaved people. Daniel received £71,562 for 4,697 enslaved people on 29 plantations in Antigua, Barbados, British Guiana, Jamaica, Montserrat, Nevis, and Tobago. His company Thomas Daniel and Co., was the third largest mercantile recipient of compensation. In 2022 his portion (the figure quoted above) is the equivalent of approximately £10.7 million based on the percentage increase in the Retail Price Index from 1834 to 2022.

Cultural and philanthropic interests
Daniel was a founding member of cultural institutions in Bristol: the Bristol, Clifton and West of England Zoological Society (now Bristol Zoo), The Bristol Institution for the Advancement of Science,  Literature and Art (now Bristol Museum and Art Gallery), and the Victoria Rooms. In 2020 these organisations are still in existence.

In 1829 Daniel was a member of the Committee which led to the building of the Clifton Suspension Bridge. One of the original 3 trustees who first met on 17 June 1830, he later chaired the first full meeting of 31 trustees on 22 June 1830. He pledged to loan £600 of the £17,350 committed to the project.

Daniel was President of Bristol charities including The Colston Society and The Dolphin Society. The Colston Society was founded in 1726 to emulate the philanthropic work of Edward Colston. It announced its closure in 2020 following the re-evaluation of Colston after the toppling of his statue on 7 June 2020. The Dolphin Society was set up for the same reason in 1749 and in October 2020 was still registered with the Charity Commission.

Bristol Corporation ran 3 charity schools governed by the Mayor and Alderman. One was the Red Maids School where "aided by the personal interest of Alderman Daniel and his wife, the headmistress conducted the school on approved contemporary lines."

Legacy

Daniel died at 92 of "natural decay and sinking of vital powers" at his home 20 Berkeley Square, Bristol on 6 April 1854 and was buried at St Mary's, Henbury where he had his country residence.

On his death he was described as "amongst the mightiest of our city magnates" in an obituary that says "[there was a time] when the name of Alderman Daniel was almost idolised by [the Tory] party... however ... he had come to be regarded as ranged with the traditions of the past."

Another obituary said: "... Alderman Daniel became the idol of one side, and the dread of the other, and on the occasion of the lamentable riots in this city in 1831, many and deep were the threats uttered by the mob that he should suffer ...  The estates of the deceased gentleman in the West Indies are of great extent, and he was of course a considerable sufferer by the suicidal policy of our Government a few years since. He leaves also large landed estates in Devonshire and Gloucestershire ...  His business faculties remained unclouded to the very last, and he was actively engaged in the concerns of the eminent firm in which he was senior partner until within a very few days of his death ...  [He was] the gentleman who for many years enjoyed the title of 'The Father of Bristol'."

In his will Daniel bequeathed small sums to servants, family, friends, political and business colleagues. He left the majority of his estate to his son Thomas (1799–1872). He did not make a single charitable bequest in his will.  His estate was said to be worth £200,000. In 2022 the equivalent value is approximately £26.2 million based on the percentage increase in the Retail Price Index from 1854 to 2022.

As at 2020, Daniel's main residence in Berkeley Square is a private member's club: The University and Literary Club.

In 1836 his son Thomas Daniel purchased Stoodleigh Court and the Stuckeridge Estate in Devon, which was the principle residence of his son (Thomas Daniel Daniel) and grandson (Thomas Carew Daniel). Several members of the Daniel family are memorialised in St. Margaret's Church in Stoodleigh. The estate was sold in 1885.

In 1839 his son Thomas Daniel purchased the 707-acre estate of Stockland Bristol for £36,368 from Bristol Corporation, which it had owned since the 16th century. He rebuilt the village church and his son Henry Arthur Daniel (1829–1912) was vicar there from 1857 to 1883; the estate remained in the family until it was sold in the early 1950s.

Thomas Daniel & Co. remained an active owner of sugar plantations, particularly in British Guiana and Barbados until its voluntary liquidation in 1894.

Danielstown 
"Danielstown" in Guyana formerly British Guiana is said to be named after the family. This was following two articles written by the Guyana Times International and Guyana Chronicle in 2014 and 2017 which described an Englishman 'Mr. Daniel' , the owner of a local sugar factory in Sparta being 'very instrumental in the development of the village'. 

The 2017 article written by the late reporter Mohamed Khan states that Immediately after emancipation Mr Daniel an Englishman and the owner of plantation Sparta, Fear Not, Coffee Grove and Lima decided to sell his lands to free African slaves on the Essequibo Coast.

Economic circumstances had forced Mr Daniel to sell his estates because they became unprofitable after slavery came to an end in 1831. Many sugar, coffee and cotton plantations in particular, faced competition with cheap labour in the USA by other slaves and the owner could not survive in such a situation. Many of the estates were left abandoned.

Mr Daniel, the owner of these four amalgamated estates of Lima, Coffee Grove, Fear Not and Sparta decided to sell Danielstown and a group of free African slaves seeing their brothers buying up abandon estates to live on, pooled their money and bought Danielstown for £2000 British pounds in 1840. These Africans like many others Africans, had saved money that they earned over time by working on the sugar, coffee and cotton plantations. They were mainly the headmen from the four sugar estates. 

Khan writes that shortly after Mr Daniel sold his land, he requested of the new owners to rename the plantation Danielstown in his honour. 

This was done and he donated his own money to help develop Danielstown for the free Africans slaves so they could live a happy and comfortable life.

The article despite being written in 2017 in Guyana, is approached with some caution as to 'Mr. Daniel' being Thomas Daniel himself due to his progressing age, memory issues and most significantly anti-abolitionist views during the 1830s. It has been suggested that the 'Mr. Daniel' may likely be referring to instead his son Thomas Daniel (1798-1872) who remained active in the West Indies as a merchant but far less politically active in the public eye of Bristol than his father.

References

External links
The Dolphin Society

Businesspeople from Bristol
18th-century English businesspeople
British slave owners
Planters from the British West Indies
19th-century English businesspeople
History of sugar
Sugar industry in the United Kingdom
1762 births
1854 deaths